Kálmán Kovács (born 11 September 1965) is a retired Hungarian football player.

He made his debut for the Hungarian national team in 1982, and got 56 caps and 19 goals until 1995. He was a participant at the 1986 FIFA World Cup in Mexico, where Hungary failed to progress from the group stage.

Following the end of his active career, he served as technical director at Honvéd and has lately been showing up as co-commentator and expert on several Hungarian TV channels, including during the 2006 World Cup.

Honours

 Budapest Honvéd
 Hungarian League: 1984, 1985, 1986, 1988, 1989
 Hungarian Cup: 1985, 1989
 APOEL
 Cypriot Championship: 1996
 Cypriot Cup: 1996
 Cyprus FA Shield: 1996

References

1965 births
Living people
Hungarian footballers
Hungarian expatriate footballers
Hungary international footballers
Hungary youth international footballers
Budapest Honvéd FC players
1986 FIFA World Cup players
Royal Antwerp F.C. players
APOEL FC players
AJ Auxerre players
Valenciennes FC players
SR Delémont players
Nemzeti Bajnokság I players
Ligue 1 players
Belgian Pro League players
Cypriot First Division players
Footballers from Budapest
Expatriate footballers in Cyprus
Expatriate footballers in Belgium
Expatriate footballers in France
Expatriate footballers in Switzerland
Hungarian expatriate sportspeople in Belgium
Hungarian expatriate sportspeople in Cyprus
Hungarian expatriate sportspeople in France
Hungarian expatriate sportspeople in Switzerland
Association football forwards